The Forty-two Articles were the official doctrinal statement of the Church of England for a brief period in 1553. Written by Archbishop Thomas Cranmer  and published by King Edward VI's privy council along with a requirement for clergy to subscribe to it, it represented the height of official church reformation prior to the reign of Queen Elizabeth I. It staked out a position among Protestant movements of the day, opposing Anabaptist claims and disagreeing with Zwinglian positions without taking an explicitly Calvinist or Lutheran approach.

Background 

After earlier doctrinal declarations (Ten Articles of 1536, a synod's Bishops' Book of 1537) Archbishop Thomas Cranmer authored Thirteen Articles in 1538 in hopes of attaining theological unity with Lutherans as King Henry VIII sought an alliance with the Lutheran Schmalkaldic League. This was not implemented, and Henry VIII instead imposed Parliament's Six Articles of 1539, mandating clerical subscription to them and requiring married clergymen to separate from their wives.

After Henry VIII's death and King Edward VI's 1547 accession, the reformation in England again picked up steam. The Six Articles were repealed, and an opening appeared for doctrinal standards which reflected the reformation's progress. However, it would take six years before the Forty-two Articles were issued. This delay occurred because, while there was sufficient support for repealing the Six Articles, it was not clear that a majority of bishops or the House of Lords would be willing to make a more definitively reformation-aligned statement. Furthermore, Archbishop Cranmer may have held out hopes of a general ecumenical council bringing new unity among Christians under reformation lines, or at the very least a common confession between continental Protestants and the Church of England. By 1551, it became clear that these were unlikely to occur in the short term, removing this objection.

Cranmer had begun to require new ministers and theological instructors to subscribe to specific doctrinal articles by 1549. In 1551, he presented a draft collection of doctrinal articles to bishops for consideration. The articles which, that year, Bishop John Hooper required clergy under him to subscribe to may have drawn from Cranmer's draft. But the Forty-two Articles were more ambitious in that they were intended as a definitive statement of doctrine for the Church of England, akin to the Augsburg Confession.

In 1551, the privy council instructed Cranmer to write Articles of Religion. The following year, his draft was sent to some bishops for comment, then to the king's six chaplains, and finally the privy council. At each point, its progress towards ratification was slowed by those less convinced of reformation doctrines, but its text appears to have remained largely as Cranmer wrote it with the help of two laymen revisers, William Cecil and John Cheke. Although it was issued under the title “Articles agreed on by the bishops and other learned men in the synod at London, in the year of our Lord God 1552”, and some bishops did gather to discuss it, it does not appear that a synod actually was convened. Nevertheless, the privy council received it from Cranmer on 24 November 1552 and issued a mandate in the king's name on 19 June 1553 that all clergy subscribe to it. There was some resistance to subscription, led by Hugh Weston, Rector of Lincoln College.

The Articles 

The Forty-two Articles attempted, in part through some ambiguity, to smooth out differences on predestination, without leaning towards fatalism. Article 17 (nearly identical in the Thirty-nine Articles) described the comfort of the doctrine that would find further development in William Perkins's Golden Chaine among others. Along with this reformed tilt, there was also generally an influence from Lutheran sources.

The Articles opposed arguments advanced by some Anabaptists,

Rejecting the Zwinglian extreme of sacramental bare symbolism, and the Catholic Mass as repetition of Christ's sacrifice (in contrast to Augsburg Confession Article 24 which sought to correct rather than do away with the mass), Articles 29 and 30 were similar to Calvinist views on the Lord's Supper, including a paragraph (removed in the Thirty-nine Articles) criticizing ideas of the ubiquity of Christ's body and his “reall, and bodilie presence” in the sacrament.

Impact 

Shortly after their proclamation in 1553, Queen Mary ascended to the throne and promulgation of the Articles ceased. But after the 1558 accession of Queen Elizabeth I, the 1563 Convocation to the Forty-two Articles reintroduced the articles (with revisions, particularly on the eucharist) as the Thirty-nine Articles. These articles have remained part of editions of the Book of Common Prayer and as doctrinal standards for the Church of England and the Anglican Communion (though their status varies within the Communion). Their influence is felt in Methodism as well through John Wesley's Arminian revision of them as the Articles of Religion.

References 

1553 in Christianity
1553 in England
Anglican theology and doctrine
Edward VI of England
English Reformation